The 2021 Formula D season (officially titled Formula Drift Pro Championship) was the eighteenth season of the Formula D series. The series began on May 8 at Road Atlanta and concluded on October 23 at Toyota Speedway at Irwindale after eight events.

Toward the end of the season, three of Formula Drift's longest-serving members announced a departure from the series, all of whom had been part of Formula Drift since is inaugural season in 2004. Co-founder and series President Jim Liaw left to take up a new position at Performance Racing Industry, but retained a role in the series; his place was taken by Vice President and fellow co-founder Ryan Sage. 2011 champion Daijiro Yoshihara announced his retirement from the series ahead of the finale. 2010 and 2020 champion Vaughn Gittin, Jr. announced that he would step back from the series to give attention to other interests, including his participation in the ULTRA4 Racing Series, but he intended to participate again in the future. His seat at RTR Motorsports will be filled by Adam LZ in 2022.

Entries

Schedule

Championship standings

Scoring system
The championship points system was altered for 2021, with points no longer awarded for qualifying positions. Points are awarded to the top 32 qualifiers for each event. The qualifiers proceed through a series of competition heats, with those eliminated in the first round (Top 32) receiving 35 points and classifying 17th through 32nd, the second round (Sweet 16) receiving 52 points and classifying 9th through 16th, the third round (Great 8) receiving 67 points and classifying 5th through 8th, and the fourth round (Final Four) receiving 80 points and classifying 3rd and 4th. In the Final, the runner-up receives 91 points and the winner 100 points. Final classification within each round is then determined by highest qualifying position; for example, of the two drivers eliminated in the Final Four, the driver who qualified higher is awarded 3rd position and the final place on the podium.

If 22 or fewer drivers are present, an alternative qualifying format is used in which a Last Chance Bracket (LCB) is populated by the drivers who qualify from 15th down. The top two LCB qualifiers enter the competition heats as normal, while the remaining LCB qualifiers (3rd down to a maximum of 8th if 22 drivers are present) receive 35 points, equivalent to the 17th–32nd positions at a regular event.

In the event of a tie on points at the end of the season, the driver who classified higher in the most recent round will be awarded the higher position.

Pro Championship standings

Auto Cup standings
Auto Cup points are awarded each round to the two drivers with the highest classified finish for each manufacturer. To be eligible, both the chassis and engine must have been constructed by that manufacturer.

Tire Cup standings
Tire Cup points are awarded each round to the two drivers with the highest classified finish for each tire manufacturer.

Footnotes

References 

Formula D seasons
Formula D